The Crescent is a daily long-distance passenger train operated by Amtrak in the eastern United States. It operates  daily between Pennsylvania Station in New York City and Union Passenger Terminal in New Orleans as train numbers 19 and 20. Major service stops outside the Northeast Corridor include Birmingham, Ala.; Atlanta, Ga.; and Charlotte, N.C.

Most of the route of the Crescent is on the Norfolk Southern Railway. It is the successor of numerous trains dating to 1891, and was first introduced in its present form in 1970 by Norfolk Southern's predecessor, the Southern Railway.

The Crescent passes through twelve states and the District of Columbia, more than any other Amtrak route. It is Amtrak's third-longest route in the East, behind only the two Silver Service routes that run from New York to Florida.

During fiscal year 2018, the Crescent carried 274,807 passengers, an increase of 6.2% from the previous year. The train had a total revenue of $29,505,818, in FY2016, down 5.8% from FY2015.

History

19th century
In the 1870s, the Richmond and Danville Railroad (R&D) — the predecessor of the Southern Railway — established the "Piedmont Air Line Route", which connected the northeastern United States with Atlanta and New Orleans via Richmond and via Norfolk Southern's present route through Charlottesville and Lynchburg. The Southern Express and the Southern Mail operated over these routes on an advertised time of 57 hours and 40 minutes, including a change at Atlanta.

On January 4, 1891, the R&D launched the Washington & Southwestern Vestibuled Limited, the earliest direct ancestor of today's Crescent. It originally connected Washington, D.C., and Atlanta. According to an official history compiled by Southern Railway, it was promoted as "a service second to none in completeness and elegance of detail ... providing all the latest and best facilities for the comfort and enjoyment of its patrons."  The South's first all-year train with vestibuled equipment, it was popularly known as simply the Vestibule. Among its amenities were "drawing-room and stateroom sleeping cars, dining cars, smoking and library cars, and observation cars." Many passengers passed the time simply walking between cars "just to enjoy the unusual experience of being able to do so without having their hats blown away."

Soon the Washington-to-Atlanta routing expanded via the West Point Route from Atlanta to Montgomery and the Louisville and Nashville Railroad from Montgomery to New Orleans, via Mobile. The route was then extended to New York (Jersey City before 1910) along the Pennsylvania Railroad's northeastern trunk line, now Northeast Corridor, via a connection in Washington with the Congressional Limited. Scheduled time for the New York-to-New Orleans run was advertised as a "40-hour, unprecedented" trip. Because of the popularity of this service, the Vestibule became a solid train of walk-through cars between New York and New Orleans. It also carried the first dining cars to operate between those two cities.

The new train's popularity was not enough to prevent the R&D from being forced into receivership in 1892. Two years later, the R&D merged with five other railroads to form the Southern Railway Company. Under Southern ownership, the train was initially called the Washington & Southwestern Limited southbound, and the New York Limited northbound.

Early 20th century

In 1906, the train was renamed the New York & New Orleans Limited in both directions, and equipped with "club cars" and observation cars.

The train is referred to in the popular 1920s railroad ballad Wreck of the Old 97, which describes the doomed train No. 97 as "not 38."  Number "38" was the operating number of the northbound New York & New Orleans Limited.  No. 97 had operated over the same tracks as No. 38 between Washington, D.C., and Atlanta, and over the same trestle where No. 97 wrecked in 1903.  The original songwriter was a Southern Railway employee, who certainly knew which train was No. 38.

The Southern Railway and Southern Pacific discussed the possibility of running a single train from Washington, D.C., to Los Angeles via New Orleans, which would have become the first truly transcontinental passenger train. The idea never came to fruition, but from 1993 to 2005, Amtrak's Sunset Limited was a transcontinental train running between Orlando, Florida, and Los Angeles.

According to railroad historian Mike Schafer,
By 1925, the train was re-equipped and renamed the Crescent Limited, a true all-Pullman extra-fare train. . . .  By 1938 the name became simply the Crescent.  It was dieselized in 1941 and streamlined in 1949.  The Crescent also carried the through (coast-to-coast) sleepers of the "Washington-Sunset Route" in conjunction with the Southern Pacific west of New Orleans to Los Angeles.

Mid-20th century

During the interwar period, the Crescent, like the Southern's other major trains, was powered south of Washington by the celebrated Ps-4 class 4-6-2 ("Pacific") locomotives. After World War II, it was powered by General Motors' Electro-Motive Division (EMD) E8 locomotives and FP-7 cab and booster units, in sets of two to five (total ).

The 1952 schedule for the 1,355 miles from Atlanta to New York was 32 hours, 55 minutes. Passengers leaving New Orleans would arrive in Atlanta just after lunch time and into Charlotte, North Carolina, in the early evening. At Charlotte, northbound trains became "all-Pullman", and limited.  The train carried sleeping cars only. It stopped only to discharge passengers, and only boarded passengers bound for destinations north of Washington. Arrival in Washington was about 4:00 a.m., but a sleeping car was uncoupled there and passengers could sleep until a more reasonable hour. The PRR carried the train north of Washington under a longstanding haulage agreement, pulling it into New York City in the morning.

Southbound, early evening departures from Washington (which had left New York in mid-afternoon) ran all-Pullman from Washington and arrived the next morning in Atlanta. Although the train carried coach cars (and made more stops) between Atlanta and New Orleans, it arrived in the early evening in the Crescent City to connect with the Sunset Limited for Texas and California. The Crescent sometimes exchanged a through sleeper with the Sunset, creating a transcontinental Pullman service in which a passenger's sleeping accommodation ran from New York City (or Washington) all the way to Los Angeles.

As passenger service dwindled, the northbound Crescent was combined with the Peach Queen, with through Atlanta-New York coaches. The southbound Crescent was combined with the Asheville Special and the Augusta Special, with through New York-Charlotte coaches. It also carried "deadhead" coaches to Atlanta for the return north on the Crescent.

Late 20th century

In 1970, Southern's railway partners sought to discontinue passenger services, Southern Railway merged its two remaining New York-New Orleans sleepers, the original Crescent and the Southerner, as the Southern Crescent. The two trains had generally shared the same route from New York to Atlanta, but diverged between Atlanta and New Orleans. The Crescent took a coastal route over Atlanta & West Point Railroad, Western Railway of Alabama and Louisville & Nashville Railroad trackage between New Orleans and Atlanta via Mobile and Montgomery; the Southerner stayed inland to run exclusively on Southern Railway trackage through Birmingham. For the combined Southern Crescent, Southern moved the train to the Birmingham route instead of the Mobile route. Although the Birmingham route was slightly less direct than the more coastal Mobile/Montgomery route, it afforded Southern the dispatch reliability of moving the train exclusively over its own right of way between Washington to New Orleans, and also allowed Southern to maintain its passenger service standards. The train was numbered 1 southbound and 2 northbound. Penn Central carried the Southern Crescent between Washington and New York along the Northeast Corridor, inheriting the longstanding haulage agreement from the Pennsylvania Railroad. For most of the 1970s, the Crescent was supplemented by the Piedmont Limited, a former New York-New Orleans train that had been cut back to a regional Atlanta-Washington (later Charlotte-Washington and Salisbury-Washington) service running along the middle leg of the Southern Crescent route.

Meanwhile, the A&WP, Western of Alabama, and L&N continued to run the Crescent between Atlanta and New Orleans. Each morning, the Crescent and the Southern Crescent departed Atlanta for New Orleans over different routes.  After November 1968, the Crescent was a coach-only train sustained by two storage mail cars.  With the discontinuance of the Humming Bird on January 9, 1969, it was run combined with the Pan-American south of Montgomery, leaving Atlanta at 7:15 p. m. on the old Piedmont Limited schedule.  In 1970, with the mail contract cancelled, the Crescent was discontinued.

Southern Railway, a predecessor of Norfolk Southern, initially opted out of Amtrak in 1971. After May 1, 1971, Amtrak inherited most of Penn Central's passenger services, including the haulage agreement for the Southern Crescent. For a portion of the mid-1970s, Southern only operated tri-weekly between Atlanta and New Orleans, and carried a run-through Amtrak 10-6 sleeper on those days to connect to the Sunset Limited. On occasion, when Southern deemed an Amtrak car to be short of Southern standards, it substituted a Southern sleeper in the consist. Also, one of the two dome coaches in the Southern car fleet was added for the leg south of Atlanta.

The Southern Crescent was one of the last two privately operated long-distance passenger services in the United States, the other being the Rio Grande Zephyr. However, mounting revenue losses and equipment-replacement expenses forced Southern Railway to leave the passenger business and turn over full operation of the train to Amtrak on February 1, 1979. Amtrak simplified the name to the Crescent, renumbering it 19 southbound and 20 northbound, although for several years the Southern assigned it operating numbers 819 and 820.

From 1989 to 1995, the Amtrak operated a section of the Crescent to Mobile, Alabama, known as the Gulf Breeze. The two trains divided at Birmingham.

21st century
In its present-day form, the southbound Crescent leaves New York in mid-afternoon and Washington, D.C., in the early evening, passing through the Carolinas overnight for arrival at breakfast time in Atlanta, lunchtime in Birmingham, and early evening at New Orleans. Northbound trains leave New Orleans at breakfast time, passing through Atlanta at dinner time and the Carolinas overnight for arrival at the end of rush hour the following day in Washington, lunchtime in Philadelphia and early afternoon in New York.

When Hurricane Katrina struck Louisiana, Mississippi, and Alabama in August 2005, the Crescent was temporarily truncated to Atlanta.  Service was restored first as far as Meridian, Mississippi, while Norfolk Southern crews worked to repair the damage to their lines serving the Gulf Coast.  Amtrak restored service to New Orleans on October 9, 2005, with the northbound Crescent's 7:05 AM departure; the first southbound arrival occurred later in the day.

In the January 2011 issue of Trains Magazine, this route was listed as one of five routes to be looked at by Amtrak in FY 2011 as the previous five routes (Sunset, Eagle, Zephyr, Capitol, and Cardinal) were examined in FY 2010.

During the summer of 2017, the train terminated at Washington instead of New York City due to track work going into New York.

Starting October 1, 2019, traditional dining car services were removed and replaced with a reduced menu of 'Flexible Dining' options. As a result, the changes to the consist of the train will have the dining car serve as a lounge car for the exclusive use by sleeping car passengers.

As part of Amtrak's Network Growth Strategy (NGS), adding a section from Meridian, Mississippi to Fort Worth, Texas has been discussed since the early 2000's, with the route having supposed to been up and running by 2002. The plan fell through when Amtrak abandoned the NGS. However, in March 2023, Amtrak announced that it is seeking federal funding to once again study this proposal. Due to Kansas City Southern Railway's (KCS) continued opposition to hosting this train on the Meridian Speedway, the study is dependent on a proposed merger between the KCS and Canadian Pacific Railway being approved by the United States Surface Transportation Board.

Route
The tracks used were once part of the Pennsylvania Railroad; Richmond, Fredericksburg and Potomac Railroad; Southern Railway and North Carolina Railroad systems; they are now owned by Amtrak, CSX Transportation, and Norfolk Southern Railway, respectively. The following lines are used:
New York City to Washington, D.C.: Northeast Corridor, ex-Pennsylvania Railroad, now Amtrak
Washington to Alexandria, Virginia: Richmond, Fredericksburg and Potomac Railroad, now CSX
Alexandria to Danville, Virginia: Virginia Midland Railway (ex-Southern Railway), now Norfolk Southern
Danville to Greensboro, North Carolina: Piedmont Air-Line Railway (ex-Southern Railway), now NS
Greensboro to Charlotte, North Carolina: North Carolina Railroad (formerly leased by Southern Railway), track managed by NS
Charlotte to Atlanta, Georgia: Atlanta and Charlotte Air-Line Railway (ex-Southern Railway), now NS
Atlanta to Birmingham, Alabama: Georgia Pacific Railway (ex-Southern Railway), now NS
Station and adjacent tracks in Birmingham: Louisville and Nashville Railroad, now CSX
 Birmingham to Meridian, Mississippi: Alabama Great Southern Railroad (ex-Southern Railway), now NS
 Meridian to New Orleans, Louisiana: New Orleans and Northeastern Railroad (ex-Southern Railway), now NS

As with other long-distance trains, passengers may not generally use the Crescent for travel between stations on the Northeast Corridor. Northbound trains only stop to discharge passengers from Alexandria northward, and southbound trains only stop to receive passengers from Newark to Washington. This policy aims to keep seats available for passengers making longer trips; passengers traveling between Northeast Corridor stations can use the more frequent Northeast Regional service.

Consist 

A usual consist on the Crescent is as follows:
 2 GE P42DC engines south of Washington D.C, or 1 Siemens ACS-64 north of Washington D.C.
 3 to 4 Amfleet II coaches
 1 Amfleet II Lounge
 1 Viewliner II dining car
 2 Viewliner sleepers
 1 Viewliner baggage-dorm

Station stops

In popular culture
The Southern Crescent is mentioned in R.E.M.'s song "Driver 8."
The Drover's Old Time Medicine Show released the song "Southern Crescent" on their Sunday at Prater's Creek album.
Scott Miller's song "Amtrak Crescent" tells the story of a down-and-out man traveling the Crescent from New Orleans to New York.
Jean Louise Finch travels from New York to Alabama on the Crescent in Harper Lee's novel Go Set a Watchman.

See also

 Piedmont Crescent
 1933 wreck of the Crescent Limited

References

Bibliography

Further reading
 
 Schafer, Mike. "Amtrak's Atlas," Trains, June 1991.

Notes

External links

Amtrak routes
Passenger trains of the Southern Railway (U.S.)
Passenger rail transportation in Alabama
Passenger rail transportation in Georgia (U.S. state)
Passenger rail transportation in Louisiana
Passenger rail transportation in Mississippi
Passenger rail transportation in North Carolina
Passenger rail transportation in South Carolina
Passenger rail transportation in Virginia
Transportation in New Orleans
Night trains of the United States
Railway services introduced in 1979
1979 establishments in the United States
Long distance Amtrak routes